Robert Ehrlich (born in 1965 in Belfast) is a Northern Irish recorder player and university professor. From October 2015 until 2019, he was rector of the Hochschule für Musik Hanns Eisler Berlin.  Previously, he was rector of the University of Music and Theatre Leipzig from 2006 to 2015.

Life 
Ehrlich was born in Belfast. He initially studied musicology at King's College, Cambridge. In 1990, he obtained a master's degree in ethnomusicology (M.Phil.). He then studied recorder with Walter van Hauwe at the Conservatorium van Amsterdam.

He performs worldwide as a soloist and in ensembles, including with the Academy of Ancient Music, the Leipzig Gewandhaus Orchestra and The English Concert. His CD recordings include recordings of Bach's Brandenburg Concertos in three different pitches with Riccardo Chailly (A4=443 Hz), Trevor Pinnock (A4=415 Hz) and Richard Egarr (A4=392 Hz). The latter two recordings won Gramophone Awards in the categories "Best Baroque Instrumental" and "Editor’s Choice".

From 1990 to 1993, Ehrlich taught recorder and teaching methodology part time at the Hochschule für Musik Karlsruhe. He was also a guest lecturer for performance practice at the University of Southampton. Since 1993 he has been professor of recorder at the University of Music und Theatre Leipzig and since 1998 visiting professor at the Guildhall School of Music and Drama in London. In 2006, Ehrlich was elected rector of the University of Music and Theatre Leipzig, where he was re-elected by a large majority for a second term by the Extended Senate in 2010.

In 2015, he was elected rector of the Hochschule für Musik Hanns Eisler Berlin by the Extended Academic Senate. In 2019, following the end of his period of office at the HfM Hanns Eisler Berlin, he resumed his tenure as professor in Leipzig, where he was elected to the University Senate in the same year and was designated special representative of the Department of Composition and Music Theory in 2021.

Functions, public offices and honorary offices 
 2012-2015 Vice-Chairman of the Landesrektorenkonferenz Saxony
 2014 Patron Christopher Street Day Leipzig
 2014-2019 Member of the Board of the Rectors' Conference of the German Universities of Music

Awards 
 1987: Schott Chamber Music Competition in London (Ensemble The Cambridge Musick with Robert Ehrlich – recorder, Andrew Manze – violin, Mark Levy – viola da gamba, and Richard Egarr – Harpsichord)
 1988: ARD International Music Competition in Munich
 1989: Moeck/SRP Competition in cooperation with London International Festival of Early Music (LIFEM)

Writings (selection) 
 "Du mußt dich nicht fürchten; diese Insel ist voll von Getöse: Rede anlässlich der feierlichen Investitur in das Rektorenamt" (PDF). MT-Journal, issue 22 (2006), Sonderbeilage, 2–8.
 "Festrede zur Gründung der Stiftung der Hochschule für Musik und Theater" (PDF). MT-Journal, issue 28 (2010) Sonderbeilage, 2–7.
 "Serendipität" (PDF). Denkströme. Journal der Sächsischen Akademie der Wissenschaften, issue 5 (2010), 9–17.
 "Die verlorenen Hanns Eisler-Bilder von Prof. ". Essay in the programme book Akademischer Festakt der Hochschule für Musik Hanns Eisler, Berlin 2016.
 "Germany National Overview; Overview of Higher Music Education System", ed. AEC (Association Européenne Conservatoires, Académies de Musique et Musikhochschulen) 2017.
 "Wiedergefundene Fragmente eines Hochschularchivs". Essay in the programme book Akademischer Festakt der Hochschule für Musik Hanns Eisler, Berlin 2018.
 The Great German Recorder Epidemic: Reinventing the Recorder, 1925–1950. (Instant Harmony Essay Series, vol. 1) Portland 2021.  
 The Recorder, co-authored with David Lasocki. (Yale University Press Musical Instrument Series) London & New York 2022. .

References

External links 
 "Hochseilakt. Zwischen Exzellenz und ausbaufähiger Politikwahrnehmung (PDF).  im Gespräch mit dem Vorstand der Rektorenkonferenz der deutschen Musikhochschulen Robert Ehrlich, Susanne Rode-Breymann und Martin Ullrich". Musikforum 14 (2016), issue 4, 22–28. Retrieved 28 April 2022.
 Leipzig Bach Festival 2014 • In conversation with Robert Ehrlich and Andreas Glöckner. Bach Archive Leipzig, recorded 11 May 2014, "Sommersaal des Bach-Museums Leipzig". Retrieved 28 April 2022.
 Publications by Robert Ehrlich on Musikbibliographie at State Institute for Music Research.
 Robert Ehrlich at German National Library Catalogue.

Living people
1965 births
20th-century British male musicians
21st-century British male musicians
Alumni of King's College, Cambridge
Academic staff of the Hochschule für Musik Karlsruhe
Academic staff of the University of Music and Theatre Leipzig
Recorder players
Recorder players by nationality
British recorder players
People from Belfast
20th-century flautists
21st-century flautists